Fuenmayor is a town located in the province of La Rioja, Spain. It is located ten kilometers from Logroño, the capital of La Rioja.

The town borders the Ebro river, the Basque-Aragonese freeway and railroad Logroño-Vitoria. Several industries and important warehouses have benefited from this strategic situation, which has also bolstered a constant increase of the population. There are 3,159 inhabitants.INE

Politics

Places of interest

Religious Buildings
 Church of Santa María
 Hermitage of the Christ
 Hermitage of Carmen
 Hermitage of San Martín

Civil Buildings
 Palace of Fernández Bazán, from the 17th century.
 Palace of the marquises of Terán, former headquarters of the Real Junta de Cosecheros.
 Renaissance palace in the Mayor Alta 20 street.
 Palace of  Urban del Campo
 House Navajas.
 El Portalón, Renaissance palace of the beginning of the 18th century.
 Cinema Gran Coliseo, building from the thirties, first spanish cinema with hanging amphitheater and without columns in the stalls.

References

External links
Council of Fuenmayor

Municipalities in La Rioja (Spain)